Puka Parya (Quechua puka red, parya reddish, copper or sparrow, Hispanicized spelling Puca Paria) is a  mountain in the Andes of Peru. It is situated in the Lima Region, Cajatambo Province, Gorgor District, and in the Huaura Province, Ambar District. Puka Parya lies northwest of Mataqucha and east of Wathiyaqucha.

References

Mountains of Peru
Mountains of Lima Region